"The Tears of a Clown" is a song written by Hank Cosby, Smokey Robinson, and Stevie Wonder and originally recorded by Smokey Robinson & the Miracles for the Tamla Records label subsidiary of Motown, first appearing on the 1967 album Make It Happen. It was re-released in the United Kingdom as a single in July 1970, and it became a #1 hit on the UK Singles Chart for the week ending 12 September 1970.  Subsequently, Motown released "The Tears of a Clown" as a single in the United States as well, where it quickly became a #1 hit on both the Billboard Hot 100 and R&B Singles charts.

This song is an international multi-million seller and a 2002 Grammy Hall of Fame inductee. Its success led Miracles lead singer, songwriter, and producer Smokey Robinson, who had announced plans to leave the act, to stay until 1972. In 2021, it was listed at No. 313 on Rolling Stone's "Top 500 Greatest Songs of All Time".

History

Origins
Stevie Wonder (who was discovered by Miracles member Ronnie White) and his producer Hank Cosby wrote the music for the song, and Cosby produced the instrumental track recording. Wonder brought the instrumental track to the 1966 Motown Christmas party because he could not come up with a lyric to fit the instrumental. Wonder wanted to see what Robinson could come up with for the track. Robinson, who remarked that the song's distinctive calliope motif "sounded like a circus," provided lyrics that reflected his vision and sang lead vocal. In the song, his character, sad because a woman has left him, compares himself to the characters in the opera Pagliacci, comedians/clowns who hide their hurt and anger behind empty smiles. He had used this comparison before: the line "just like Pagliacci did/I'll try to keep my sadness hid" appears in this song as well as in "My Smile Is Just A Frown (Turned Upside Down)", which he had written in 1964 for Motown artist Carolyn Crawford. The record is one of the few hit pop singles to feature the bassoon, which was played by Charles R. Sirard.

"The Tears of a Clown" was an album track on 1967's Make It Happen but was not released as a single. "The Tears of a Clown" on the monaural version of Make It Happen contains an alternate lead vocal with a slightly different verse melody. By 1969, Robinson had become tired of constantly touring with the Miracles, and wanted to remain home in Detroit, Michigan, with his wife Claudette and their two children, Berry and Tamla (both named after aspects of the Motown corporation). Robinson informed his groupmates Pete Moore, Bobby Rogers, and best friend Ronald White that he would be retiring from the act to concentrate on his duties as vice-president of Motown Records.

Commercial success
In 1970, to capitalize on the Miracles' success there, and due to a lack of new material from the group, Motown Britain selected "The Tears of a Clown" from the group's catalog for single release. One account suggests it was Karen Spreadbury, head of the British division of the Motown Fan Club, who first recommended the track to John Reid, then UK manager for the American Tamla Motown label, who went on to manage Elton John and Queen, when he asked her which track she'd favor as a single from the 1967 album. Reid reportedly then gave the go ahead for “Tears of A Clown” to be issued as the single. The record became a #1 hit in the UK seven weeks after its July release.

This newfound popularity prompted Motown to release the song as a single in the United States, using a new mix of the song made in February 1970 (whereas the UK release had used the original 1967 stereo mix from the Make It Happen LP).  Cash Box said of the US single release that it was a "brilliant return to the heyday sound of the Miracles," calling it "bright blues rock that hasn't been heard here for a long while." It became a #1 hit on both the pop and R&B charts within two months of its release. Despite the fact that the Miracles had been one of Motown's premier acts in the early and mid-1960s and its first successful group act, "The Tears of a Clown" was their first and only #1 hit while Smokey Robinson was lead singer. (The Miracles hit #1 again several years later with the smash hit "Love Machine", but by that time Smokey had long since left the group, replaced by Billy Griffin. "Shop Around" had hit #1 on the Cash Box Pop Chart, but only #2 on Billboard's.)

The 45 single was issued with two different B-sides: the first pressing had an alternate version of the 1967 Miracles Top 20 hit single "The Love I Saw in You Was Just a Mirage;" the second had a new Miracles song, "Promise Me". Motown released a Tears of a Clown LP in 1970 as well, which was essentially a re-packaging of the Miracles' 1967  Make It Happen. It was included again on the group's 1971 LP One Dozen Roses, which used a new stereo mix.

Two years later, Smokey Robinson decided to follow through with his plans to leave the Miracles and retire. Smokey Robinson & the Miracles embarked on a six-month farewell tour, culminating in a July 16, 1972 performance in Washington, DC, where Robinson introduced the Miracles' new lead singer, Billy Griffin.

The song charted again in the UK in 1976, peaking at #34 (see The Miracles discography). "The Tears of a Clown" continues to be a popular radio request.

Charts

Weekly charts

Year-end charts

All-time charts

Certifications

Personnel
The Miracles
Smokey Robinson – lead vocals
Claudette Rogers Robinson – background vocals
Pete Moore – background vocals
Ronnie White – background vocals
Bobby Rogers – background vocals
Marv Tarplin – guitar

Other personnel
 Written by Stevie Wonder, Hank Cosby, and William "Smokey" Robinson 
 Produced by Hank Cosby and William "Smokey" Robinson
 Charles R. Sirard – bassoon 
 Mike Terry – baritone saxophone
 Melvin Davis – drums
 Other instrumentation by the Funk Brothers
There is some uncertainty about who from the Motown session musicians the Funk Brothers played bass on the recording. Variously Tony Newton, Bob Babbitt, and James Jamerson have been noted as playing on takes of the song. It is speculated that Jamerson performed on the original track. When Motown prepared the song for a US single release in 1970, they dubbed in new drums and bass. Babbitt is credited as playing bass on the 1970 dub.

The Beat version

In 1979, British ska/new wave band The Beat released a cover of the song as their debut single. The double A-side with "Ranking Full Stop" reached number 6 on the UK Singles Chart, making it the band's third biggest hit. It was also certified silver in the UK by the BPI.

It wasn't included on the original UK release of The Beat's debut album, I Just Can't Stop It, but was included on the US release and has been included on subsequent CD reissues of the album.

Track listing
 "Tears of a Clown" – 2:39
 "Ranking Full Stop" – 2:47

Personnel

Dave Wakeling – lead vocals, rhythm guitar
Ranking Roger – toasting, vocals
Andy Cox – lead guitar
David Steele – bass
Everett Morton – drums
Saxa – saxophone

Charts

Other recordings

 Petula Clark recorded the song in 1971 for her album Petula '71.
 The song was recorded by Eumir Deodato for his 1982 album Happy Hour, in a funk re-arrangement.
 In 1984, The Flying Pickets recorded the song on their album Lost Boys.
 In 1986, Baby Tuckoo recorded the song as the A-side for an EP release.
 The song was covered on Enuff Z'Nuff's compilation of their original demos, 1985. In 1987 a cover was done by "Bassix".
 In late 1993, Australian punk-rock band Caligula had an Australian #25 hit with the song.
 The song was recorded by La Toya Jackson in 1995 for her album Stop in the Name of Love
 The J-ska band Potshot recorded it on the album Pots and Shots, released in 1997.
 Phil Collins recorded it as a B-side to his song "Wake Up Call", taken from his 2003 album Testify, and later re-recorded it during the sessions of his 2010 album Going Back.
Jazz artist Nnenna Freelon included the song both on her 2002 studio album Tales of Wonder and in a live setting on her 2008 best-of compilation Better Than Anything: The Quintessential Nnenna Freelon.
 Brian Ray, guitarist for Paul McCartney, released a rock-flavored version of the song in 2005.
 In May 2010, American Pop punk band A Loss for Words released their album Motown Classics, which featured their rendition of the song.
 Marc Cohn released a laid-back bluesy version on his 2010 album Listening Booth: 1970, as it was one important influence for him in that formative year for his musical identity.
 Pond released a free download of the song in 2012 via their label's website.
 Irish boy band Boyzone on their 2014 Motown tribute album Dublin to Detroit.

Other uses 
 The song provides the template for the bassline of the 1987 hit "When Smokey Sings", by the New Wave band ABC, from their album Alphabet City.
 The song is mentioned in Roxette's song "Spending My Time" from the 1991 album Joyride.
 The song is mentioned in Diddy – Dirty Money's song "Coming Home" from the 2010 album Last Train to Paris.
 The song is the theme tune to the BBC sitcom Boomers (2014-2016).
 The version by The Beat is used in a 2008 episode of American Dad!.

See also 
 List of Hot 100 number-one singles of 1970 (U.S.)
 Vesti la giubba

References

External links
 "The Tears of a Clown"  at Superseventies.com
 List of cover versions of "The Tears of a Clown" at SecondHandSongs.com

1967 songs
1970 singles
1979 debut singles
The Miracles songs
The Beat (British band) songs
Billboard Hot 100 number-one singles
Cashbox number-one singles
UK Singles Chart number-one singles
Grammy Hall of Fame Award recipients
Motown singles
Songs written by Henry Cosby
Songs written by Stevie Wonder
Songs written by Smokey Robinson
Song recordings produced by Smokey Robinson
Song recordings produced by Bob Sargeant
Tamla Records singles
2 Tone Records singles
Chrysalis Records singles
Songs about clowns
Songs about heartache